CZ stands for Česká zbrojovka which means Czech Armory. Most CZ-marked firearms are connected with Česká zbrojovka Uherský Brod (ČZUB) – a Czech firearms manufacturer founded 1936. CZ is a registered trade mark.

History
Historically there were several other factories associated with the name Česká zbrojovka ("Czech Arms Factory" in Czech), often rendered simply as "ČZ" in general. Below you can find a list of different producers of weapons in the Czech republic, during different periods.

The factories include:
 Česká zbrojovka Uherský Brod (ČZUB) – since 1936
 Zbrojovka Praga – founded before 1917, and active 
 Československá státní zbrojovka (Zbrojovka Brno) – 1917–2007
 Česká zbrojovka Strakonice – since 1919
 Zbrojovka Vsetín (ZVI)  – since 1937
 Alfa-Proj  – since 1993
 Arms Moravia (Technoex)  – founded 1993

Firearms made in many different factories in Czechoslovakia and later the Czech Republic have been sold under the name ČZ, Brno or Vz.

ČZ (or CZ) is an abbreviation of Česká zbrojovka, while vz. (or Vz., vz, Vz) is an abbreviation of vzor ("model"). In most cases, only weapons adopted by the Czechoslovak or Czech military have the sign "vz." in the name, although there are some exceptions to this rule. Sa (or Sa.) is an abbreviation of samopal ("submachine gun"). The Czech army used the term "samopal" for the Sa vz. 58 although it is an assault rifle, so this may be as an analogy to Russian term automat.

Note that military weapons after World War II were designed by several independent development centers (e.g., ZVS-VVÚ Brno, VTÚVM Slavičín etc.) and then assigned to a production factory.

ČZW
Czech Weapons (ČZW) was a subsidiary group of Česká zbrojovka who develops and evaluates firearms.

Developments and Products
ČZW-556 (Czech Republic - Assault Rifle - 5.56×45mm NATO)
ČZW-762 (Czech Republic - Light Machine Gun - 7.62×39mm M43)
ČZW-438 (Czech Republic - Personal Defence Weapon - 4.38×30mm Libra)
ČZW-438 M9 (Czech Republic - Submachine Gun - 9×19mm Parabellum)
ČZW-9 (Czech Republic - Submachine Gun - 9×19mm Parabellum)
ČZW-9M (Czech Republic - Submachine Gun - 9×19mm Parabellum)
ČZW-9PS (Czech Republic - Submachine Gun - 9×19mm Parabellum)
ČZW-9FC (Czech Republic - Submachine Gun - 9×19mm Parabellum)
ČZW-127 (Czech Republic - Anti Materiel Rifle - 12.7×99mm NATO)
ČZW-40 (Czech Republic - Grenade Launcher - 40×53mm)
RAG-30 (Czech Republic - Grenade Launcher - VOG 17)
SAG-30 (Czech Republic - Grenade Launcher - VOG 17)

See also
To see the full article about firearms produced by this company please see * Česká zbrojovka Uherský Brod (ČZUB)

Notes

Ceska Zbrojovka
Companies of Czechoslovakia